The Little Girl Next Door is a 1912 American silent short drama directed by Lucius Henderson and written by Philip Lonergan. The film starred William Garwood and Marguerite Snow in the lead roles. Prints of the film are in the Library of Congress and other collections.

Plot

Cast
 William Garwood as The Husband
 Marguerite Snow as The Wife 
 Marion Fairbanks as Helen Randall
 Madeline Fairbanks as Ruth Foster
 William Russell as The Other Father

References

External links

1912 films
1912 drama films
Thanhouser Company films
Silent American drama films
American silent short films
American black-and-white films
Films directed by Lucius J. Henderson
1912 short films
1910s American films